Josie Nelson (born 8 April 2002) is an English international cyclist. She has represented England at the Commonwealth Games.

Biography
In 2021, Nelson won a silver medal at the British National Road Race Championships riding for Team Coop-Hitec Products. She also won the third round of the UK Cyclo-Cross National Trophy and competed in the Under-23 European Championships.

In 2022, she was selected for the 2022 Commonwealth Games in Birmingham. She competed in the women's road race.

Personal life
Her sister is Emily Nelson is a world madison champion.

Major results

Cyclo-cross

2018–2019
 1st  Overall Junior National Trophy Series
 National Trophy Series
3rd Ipswich
2019–2020
 1st  Overall Junior National Trophy Series
 2nd National Junior Championships
2021–2022
 National Trophy Series
1st Falkirk
2nd Gravesend
2nd Broughton Park
 1st Clanfield

Road

2021
 2nd Road race, National Road Championships
2022
1st  National circuit race championship
 7th Grand Prix International d'Isbergues
 9th Overall Tour de la Semois
 9th Leiedal Koerse
2023
 4th Cadel Evans Great Ocean Road Race

References

2002 births
Living people
British female cyclists
Cyclists at the 2022 Commonwealth Games
Commonwealth Games competitors for England